Fiddlers Three is a 1948 short subject directed by Jules White starring American slapstick comedy team The Three Stooges (Moe Howard, Larry Fine and Shemp Howard). It is the 107th entry in the series released by Columbia Pictures starring the comedians, who released 190 shorts for the studio between 1934 and 1959.

Plot
The Stooges are fiddlers at the court of Old King Cole (Vernon Dent). They are forbidden by the king to marry their sweethearts until Princess Alicia (Virginia Hunter) weds Prince Gallant III of Rhododendron "when the flowers bloom in the Spring." Evil magician Murgatroyd (Philip Van Zandt) has his own plans to marry Alicia, and promptly abducts her. While the Stooges are trying to apply new horseshoes to their horses, they accidentally fall through the floor where they find the Princess bound and gagged. The Magician meanwhile gets the King's agreement that if he can recover the Princess he can marry her. His assistant leaves his magic box by climbing through a hole, the plan being to push the Princess through it. Moe and Larry insult the guards, making them run out. Shemp frees the Princess, but he and the others are captured. However the guards are distracted when the magician's assistant walks past, following her. The Stooges escape up the rope ladder into the box, which Murgatroyd is sawing through and then sticking swords into, hurting the Stooges. Finally the box breaks and the Stooges fall out, just before Alicia runs in and tells her father who abducted her. The Stooges attacks the magician, but stop when the assistant walks past, they, Murgatroyd and Cole following her, save for Shemp, who asks for water. When the Princess gives him water it spurts out of him due to the magicians' swords.

Production notes
Fiddlers Three was filmed on May 26–29, 1947. Like Squareheads of the Round Table and The Hot Scots, it was filmed on the existing set of the feature film The Bandit of Sherwood Forest.

This is the 13th of 16 Stooge shorts with the word "three" in the title.

Fiddlers Three was remade in 1954 as Musty Musketeers, using ample stock footage.

References

External links
 
 

1948 films
The Three Stooges films
American black-and-white films
Fiction set in Roman Britain
Arthurian films
Films directed by Jules White
1948 comedy films
Columbia Pictures short films
American comedy short films
1940s English-language films
1940s American films